The Ultimate Collection is a compilation album by B.B. King, released in 2005.

Track listing
"Three O'Clock Blues" – 3:01
"Please Love Me" – 2:48
"You Upset Me Baby" – 3:01
"Sweet Sixteen" – 6:12
"Rock Me Baby" – 2:58
"How Blue Can You Get" – 2:41
"Every Day I Have the Blues" – 2:41
"Sweet Little Angel" – 3:46
"Don't Answer the Door" – 5:10
"Paying the Cost to Be the Boss" – 2:33
"The Thrill is Gone" – 5:25
"Nobody Loves Me But My Mother" – 1:26
"Chains & Things" (w/ Carole King) – 4:53
"Ain't Nobody Home" – 3:14
"I Like to Live the Love" – 3:17
"Never Make a Move Too Soon" – 5:30
"Better Not Look Down" – 3:20
"There Must Be a Better World Somewhere" – 3:46
"When Love Comes to Town" (w/ U2) – 4:17
"Ten Long Years" (w/ Eric Clapton) – 4:40
"I'll Survive" – 4:51

References

2005 greatest hits albums
B.B. King compilation albums